Odanad (Malayalam: ōṭānāṭŭ, also known as Onattukara, Onad, Kayamkulam, Kallikoilon and Chirava Svaroopam) was a feudal state in late medieval Kerala. It was established in the 11th century, and disestablished in 1746 when it became part of Travancore after Venad King Marthanda Varma's northern expedition. The last king of Odanad was King Kotha Varma. At the time of its dissolution, it was composed of the present-day taluks of Mavelikkara, Karthikapally, Chenganur in the Alappuzha district and Karunagapally in the Kollam district. In the 15th century, the capital of Odanad was moved from Kandiyoor-Muttom, Mavelikkara to Eruva and Krishnapuram, near Kayamkulam, which led to the state being called Kayamkulam. After this shift, Kayamkulam became the commercial centre of Odanad, while Mavelikkara remained its cultural centre. Odanad was controlled by Nair lords, among whom the ruler of Kayamkulam was the most prominent.

Today, the region is better known as Onattukara, the name used for one of the many revenue villages included in the Mavelikkara taluk. The Sri Krishna Swamy Temple in Eruva, located two kilometres north of Kayamkulam, is one of the prominent establishments in Onattukara.

Etymology 
The word Odanad is a transliteration of the Malayalam word ഓടനാട്, ōṭānāṭŭ, which is a portmanteau of ഓടം, ōṭām meaning boat, and നാട്, nāṭŭ, meaning land, so Odanad means the land of boats. An alternative hypothesis is that the first part of the word derives from ഓടമുള, ōṭāmuḷa, meaning bamboo, and that Odanad means the land of bamboo. Kerala Varma Valiya Koil Thampuran's Sanskrit work Mayura Sandesam describes Odanad as the land of vines.

Mavelikkara, the capital of Odanad, is associated with Maveli, the central figure in the festival of Onam. The state was hence known as Onattukara (ഓണാട്ടുകര, ōṇāṭṭukara), which translates to the land of Onam.

The state was metonymically referred to as Kayamkulam after the capital was moved to the city of Kayamkulam.

History

11th – 14th century 
Copper plate inscriptions in Thiruvalla, dated to the 11th century, mention Odanad and Mattom, then its capital. These inscriptions, along with the Unnuneeli Sandesam, also note the significance of Chennithala whips in Odanad.

Most of the records of the rulers of Odanad come from the temple records of the Kandiyoor Sree Mahadeva Temple.

15th – 18th century 
In 1743, Odanad was bordered by the feudal states of Pandalam, Thekkumkur, Elayadath, Vadakkumkur, Purakkad and Thrikkunnapuzha, according to records left by Julius Valentin van Gollenesse, Commander of Dutch Malabar at the time.

Odanad was demarcated from Vadakkumkur by the southern road from the Kandiyoor Sree Mahadeva Temple, which formed Odanad's western border with Vadakkumkur. The eastern half of the temple was under the jurisdiction of Vadakkumkur, while the western half was in Odanad.

Following the annexation of Quilon by King Marthanda Varma of the newly established Kingdom of Travancore, Odanad organised a confederacy to liberate Quilon and restore its ruler. The Northern Alliance of Odanad, Purakkad, Vadakkumkur, and Cochin succeeded in retaking Quilon and restoring its ruler. When the ruler of Quilon died in 1734, Odanad claimed the territory by virtue of adoption and immediately took possession of it. Travancore still claimed Quilon for itself and war broke out in 1739. The Queen of Elayadath, restored by the Dutch Empire, attacked Travancore from the east, while Odanad moved in from the north and the Dutch landed in the south. Travancore made quick work of the untrained levies of Elayadath and, turning south, inflicted a crushing defeat on the Dutch in the Battle of Colachel. After failing to hold the Kilimanoor Fort in 1742, the forces of Odanad were chased back to the walls of their capital. The defeated ruler signed a separate peace agreement, the Treaty of Mannar, according to which Odanad became a tributary of Travancore and ceded it more than half of its territories.

By 1746, Odanad had been persuaded by the Dutch to take up the leadership of a new confederation which included Chembakassery, Thekkumkur and Purakkad. In this fourth war known as Battle of Purakkad between the states, Odanad was again defeated and its territories finally annexed to Travancore.

Politics

Government 
Odanad was controlled by Nair lords, among whom the ruler of Kayamkulam was the most prominent.

Foreign relations 
Odanad maintained friendly relations with the Portuguese and the Dutch empires since the 16th century.

Military 

Odanadu Dynasty was one of the strongest Military powered state in ancient Kerala. One among the strongest and brave army power, Kayamkulam provided mortal support to the surrounding local states and helped them to lead war against their rivals.
The identity Weapon was " Double side sharpen Sword" commonly called Kayamkulam Vaal.

Economy 
The King of Kayamkulam had trade relations with foreigners in the backwaters west of Pullukulangarak, as proof of this, the huge trade can still be seen in the Pandikashala. From this the king had unprecedented financial reserves. When Marthanda Varma attacked Kayamkulam, the king escaped to Iringlakudak through this port.

Demographics

Religion

Chettikulangara Temple 
The Chettikulangara Devi Temple in Chettikulangara, Mavelikkara is dedicated to the Hindu goddess Chettikulangara Amma, who is considered as the mother goddess of Onattukara. It is believed to have been consecrated by Padmapadacharyar, a disciple of Adi Shankara, on the Uthrattathi day of Makara month in AD 823. The goddess worshipped here is believed to have been a family deity, and later emerged as the village and then the regional deity. Local historians oppose the argument that the temple is not as ancient as the nearby Kandiyoor Sree Mahadeva Temple or Mavelikkara Krishna Swamy Temple and Kannamangalam Mahadeva Temple as it had not been mentioned in the Unnuneeli Sandesam.  written in the 14th century. Also, there is no mentioning of the temple in the British survey records. According to late Kandiyoor Mahadeva Shasthri, Samudra Bandhan, a leading courtier of Ravi Varman, an ancient King of Venad had visited this temple and wrote poems on Bhagavathi. They also hold that Aadithya Kulasekharan, the King of Venad (1374 to 1389) had also visited the Chettkulangara temple.

The mythology surrounding the temple has it that after Parasurama created Kerala. He had established 108 Durga temples, 108 Shiva temples, numerous Sastha temples, besides 108 Kalaris (place to learn traditional martial arts in front of the deity), Shakthi Kendras and five Ambalayas, one of which was Jagadambika of Chettikulangara, the Goddess of Odanad. The myth behind the temple's origin is related to clash between local landlords and it is clearly mentioned in the kuthiyotta pattu. The actual paradevatha dtas built by Kayamkulam Rajas (king). Lord Krishna is the Aradhana Moorthy (worship) of kayamkulam rajas. Makaram Festival one of the largest festivals in middle travencore. This festival is celebrated in 10 days (ulsavam). The seventh and eighth days festivals are very important. 7-ulsavam celebrated in temple's west region (padinjare kara) and 8-ulsavam celebrated in temple's east region (kizhakke kara). Eruva Sreekrishna's Arattukulam is one of biggest ponds in middle Kerala. The Valiya Kakkanadu Madom near to Eruva Sree Krishna swamy temple is famous for the Gandharva temple, warriors who trained the military arts for Odanadu army and army heads of King belonged to this family.

The ancient temple at the place Evoor is in the Onattukara region. This temple had originated in the presence of Bhagavan Sri Krishna himself.

This temple is one of the most important 26 Maha-Vishnu shrines in the world. The myth is linked to 'Khandava-dahanam' (burning of Khandava forest), described in 'Mahabharata'. The remains of burnt trees being widely found here, confirm this. Further evidence are, nearby Mannarassala and 'Pandavarkavu' temples. (The research conducted by the archeology dept. of Kerala reveals that the fossils remains found in the fields near to the temple are not burned one. The forest cover fell down centuries back due to excessive sea level increase and flooding the area under sea. Carbon dating is also done to determine the time period.)

The great Kanva Maharshi (one of the top 7 Rishis), had been living in this part of Onattukara. 'Kannamangalam' (Kanva-mangalam) is nearby. His 'Ashramam' (hermitage) later became a temple. Evoor Krishnaswamy's yearly 'Arattu' (ceremonial bath) is held in this temple's tank.

Origin 
According to local mythology, Agni deva, the Hindu god of fire, had been suffering from a severe stomach ailment. As a remedy, Lord Brahma advised him to consume the herb-rich Khandava Forest. The forest was home to serpent-king Takshaka, a close friend of Lord Indra. Whenever Agni tried to consume the forest, Lord Indra's thundershowers dutifully extinguished the fire.

Agni appeared in the form of a brahmin to seek the help of Krishna and Arjuna, who were visiting the area. They set up a fire to consume the forest. Maharshi Kanva arrived to save his 'Archa Murti'. a four armed image of Vishnu. Krishna granted a boon that the murti would not be harmed by fire. Soon, Agni started consuming Khandava Forest. Lord Indra used thundershowers promptly but on Krishna's advice, Arjuna constructed a canopy of arrows to prevent the rain from disrupting Agni's consumption of the forest. Thus Agni's ailment was cured.

As a sign of thankfulness, Agni sought permission to install that murti in a new temple there to facilitate worship. As instructed by Krishna, Arjuna fired an arrow to determine the location. A new temple was soon consecrated where the arrow had landed. Evoor is the shortened form of 'Eytha ooru', meaning the place from where the arrows were showered to make the canopy of arrows. Krishna infused his divine power into the murti and Arjuna performed its first puja. A murti of Bhootha Natha Swamy (Kiratha Murti form of Lord Siva), together with Yakshi Amma (Devi Parvati) were consecrated as the sub-deities. The ancient trees roofing them are the survivors of Khandava Forest.

Fire and re-construction 
In the 1880s, the temple was destroyed in a fire. When the 'Sree Kovil' (sanctum sanctorum) was caught fire, so many people tried to remove the Deity, but failed. At last, an old Brahmana-devotee of the adjacent house, after taking a dip in the temple tank, entered the raging flames and brought out the Deity, safely.

Sri Moolam Thirunal, then king of Travancore, was in Kasi at that time. Appearing as a Brahmana-boy in his dream, Sri Krishna asked the king to re-construct the Evoor temple. Immediately, the king returned home and constructed a huge temple complex. It contained royal facilities such as security trenches atop the roof all around and underground drainage network to discharge the 'abhishka water' from 'Srikovil' to adjacent temple tank.

The renowned 'Tharananalloor Tantri' (whose ancestor had been brought to Kerala by Sri Parashurama) was appointed as the traditional 'Tantri'. Immense wealth (including lands and other assets) was arranged to ensure self-reliance. Also, extensive neighbourhood facilities and all necessary infrastructure were put in place for the temple.

Prayoga Chakra Prathishta 
Evoor Bhagavan's Deity is the unique Prayoga Chakra Prathishta. Live 'Sudarshana Chakra' in rear right hand; Panchjanya Sankha in rear left hand; Butter in frontal right hand; and the frontal left hand is held on the hip as a mani-bandham.

Bhagavan is in a combative mood ready to release 'Sudarshana Chakra'. He is the 72-year-old Sri Krishna at His peak glory and power.

Vedic experts have confirmed the extremely rare divine presence of "Sri Chakra" on this deity. Consequently, "Raktha-pushpanjali" is a special offering here which is unavailable in Vishnu temples elsewhere.

Evoor temple is popularly known as the "Guruvayoor of Onattukara".

Evoor temple is situated near the Cheppad Railway station between Kayamkulam and Harippad. The railway line is called the "Theera Desa" (coastal route which is not the main railway route). It is easier to reach there by bus. Cheppad is about 7 km north of Kayamkulam bus stand. From Harippad Bus stand Evoor is about 5 km south. You can get down at Cheppad Junction and go by an auto-rickshaw to Evoor temple. Alternatively, one can get down at the bus stop (south of Cheppad and north of Ramapuram Devi temple) on NH-47 and walk up to the temple which is about 1 km east of NH-47.

Buddhist legacy 

Mavelikkara was once a flourishing centre of Buddhist culture, and an ancient Buddha statue currently raised in Mavelikkara town, at Buddha Junction in front of the Krishnaswamy temple, was excavated more by accident in the early 1900s from a paddy field near the Kandiyoor temple. It is possible that a lot more of the vanished Buddhist civilisation of Onnattukara still lies buried in history, yet to be unearthed. Names of towns and villages in the Onattukara region carry the palli suffix, which was common usage in Pāli, the language of Hinayana Buddhism. Karunagapalli, Karthikapalli, Pallickal, Pallippuram, Puthupalli are examples of such historical and present names of places in the Onattukara region. The Portuguese had a factory in Odanadu in the 16th century, but Odanad was the earliest ally of the Dutch in Malabar..

Ramapuram Bhagavthi Temple-Odanadu Dynasty Temple 

Ramapuram Bhagavathy Temple[Ramapurathamma ] is considered as the Kingdom deity temple of Odanadu(Kayamkulam Kingdom) [Odanadu Rulers]. After stealing the Sreechakram, sanctified at sanctum of Ramapurathamma, the then Trippappur king Marthandavarma and his Chief [Dalava] Ramayyan had conquered Kayamkulam .The absence of the most sacred Sreechakram rendered them powerless and it paved the way for Marthanda Varma to establish his supremacy over Kayamkulam dynasty .

Syrian Christians of Odanad
The Syrian Christians of Odanad existed even before the establishment of the Kingdom. Chengannur being the earliest centre where the Chengannur Old Syrian Church was established in the 4th century by the Syrian Christian migrants from Niranam and Nilakkal. Later in the 7th century a church was built in Haripad but was demolished in the 11th century and half of the Syrian Christians of Haripad joined the Karthikapally Syrian Church which was built in AD 829 AD by the Syrian Christian migrants from Chengannur, and the other half established the Cheppad Syrian Church in 1175 AD. Kayamkulam became a commercial capital owing to its port merchantry and many Syrian Christians migrated to Kayamkulam. These Syrians relied on the Kadampanad Syrian Church (built in AD 325) till the establishment of the Kayamkulam Kadeesha Syrian Church in AD 824 by Mar Sabor and Mar Aphroth. In AD 943 the Syrian Christians of Mavelikkara built the Mavelikkara Puthiyakavu Syrian Church when they split from the Kayamkulam Kadeesha Syrian Church. Odanad consists majorly of the Puthenkoottukar.

Culture 
Festivals in Odanad include the Jeevatha Nritham, a traditional form of dance, and the Kettukazhcha, which has its origins in Buddhism.

ഓച്ചിറ പരബ്രഹ്മാ ക്ഷേത്രത്തിൽ മിഥുനം 1,2 തീയതി കളിൽ നടക്കുന്ന ഓച്ചിറ കളി പണ്ടുകാലത്തു കായംകുളം രാജാവിന്റെ സൈന്യത്തിലേക്കു പടയാളികളെ എടുക്കുന്ന വാർഷിക ആഘോഷത്തെയാണ് സൂചിപ്പിക്കുന്നത്.ഇന്നും മുടക്കമില്ലാത്ത ഈ ആചാരം തുടരുന്നു.

See also 
 History of Kerala
 Battle of Purakkad

References 

History of Alappuzha district
Feudal states of Kerala